Odd Job Jack is a  Canadian adult animated sitcom starring Don McKellar, about one man's misadventures in temporary employment. Seen on and produced for The Comedy Network, a cable specialty channel, Adult Swim and MuchMusic in Latin America, 2x2 in Russia, Hulu in the United States, and MusiquePlus in the French speaking Canada. A total of 52 episodes were produced over four seasons.

Production
Odd Job Jack is created by Smiley Guy Studios in Toronto, Ontario. The show was originally developed as a web-based cartoon, but quickly moved to cable television distribution. The producers of the show pay homage to their web roots by maintaining a web site that contains unique interactive content to support each episode, largely consisting of Flash games. They advertised this connection as being a "sit.com".

On July 14, 2006 in an email to subscribers, Smiley Guy Studios announced FreeJack, an initiative under which they have started releasing the master files of every character, prop, and background from every episode for the upcoming season under a non-commercial share-friendly license. However, in 2007, after the fourth season the show definitely ended production.

Every episode is structured by the opening theme, the full episode and the closing credits.

Plot
The eponymous character, Jack Ryder, graduates from university with a degree in sociology and becomes a temporary employee at an agency called Odd Jobs which specializes in filling difficult and unusual positions. Each episode ends with Jack adding a chapter to a book which he is writing about his experiences on his laptop.

When not working, Jack often hangs with his eccentric friends, Leopold "Leo" Trench, an agoraphobic computer hacker who, like one of the characters in McKellar's earlier comedy series, Twitch City, is unable to leave his apartment but nonetheless leads a complex and bizarre life, and Bobby Lee, an Asian kid who works in the family store by day, and is a club disc-jockey and masked hero by night.

Jack also spends some time at the beginning and end of each episode at the agency where he attempts to develop a rapport with Betty Styles, the female assignment "associate" while under electronic surveillance from the gruff, imperious, and decidedly unpleasant, manager/owner (Mr. Fister) who is often involved in some way in the bizarre conspiracies, sordid sexual escapades, and crimes which lurk behind the workaday appearances of Jack's assignments.

Mr. Fister never appears in season three, but makes a final appearance in season four, while at the conclusion of season three Betty, after stealing the company jet to rescue Jack from African kidnappers, runs away to a distant country. Instead Jack is greeted in each season four episode with a new assignment associate, each with a personality defect. The first season also featured Jacques, a French Canadian doppelgänger to Jack who serves as an office nemesis.

Season One
Among the unusual situations in which Jack finds employment during the show's first season are mortuary worker; rodent wrangler on the set of a James Bond-like movie produced entirely with rodents; tree-planter in Bigfoot country; waiter in a chi-chi restaurant where something is definitely not right in the kitchen; security guard in a high-tech firm; Eighties-style business executive in a take-over firm; and Christian theme-park employee. None of these assignments are as straightforward as they seem. Jack's co-workers and employers can only be described as contentedly psychotic.

In the rodent wrangler episode, McKellar plays and parodies himself as a stereotypical vain, role-hungry and superficial actor, as well as voicing the anti-hero, Jack, and is the subject of a self-deprecatory episode based on Being John Malkovich in which a tunnel is dug from Jack's kitchen into McKellar the actor's ego.

There are also a number of sly allusions in the episode to McKellar's movies, including The Red Violin (1998) and Highway 61 (1991).

Cast
Don McKellar as Jack Ryder
Matthew Ferguson as Bobby Lee
Jeremy Diamond as Leopold Trench

Guests
The show features voice work by a number of largely Canadian celebrities, especially after the first season: celebrities appear occasionally on the second season, and the third season has a special celebrity guest star for each episode, who either play themselves or voice one of the show's eccentric, if not mad, characters. Celebrities in the first season were Dave Foley, Troy Hurtubise and Gary Farmer. The second season featured the Barenaked Ladies, Jeff Tweedy of Wilco, John O'Hurley, Megan Follows, Christopher Plummer, Rick Mercer, Kenny Hotz, Catherine O'Hara and Don Knotts. And the third season sees Tom Arnold, Scott Thompson, James Woods, Tom Green, Leslie Nielsen, Will Arnett, Samantha Bee, and John Goodman accompany Jack on his adventures in the weird world of work.

Reception 
Odd Job Jack was nominated for the Canadian Comedy Awards in 2007 in the "Writing Series" category.

Notes
Review of Odd Job Jack, TheGATE.ca

See also

List of Odd Job Jack episodes
Chilly Beach
Some Mothers Do 'Ave 'Em

References

External links
 Odd Job Jack Homepage (now defunct)
 Odd Job Blog
 Smiley Guy Studios Homepage
 FreeJack (now defunct)
 "Free Jack City" -kapiTal magazine, December 2006
 

2000s Canadian adult animated television series
2000s Canadian sitcoms
2000s Canadian workplace comedy television series
2003 Canadian television series debuts
2007 Canadian television series endings
Canadian adult animated comedy television series
Canadian animated sitcoms
Canadian flash animated television series
CTV Comedy Channel original programming
English-language television shows
Television shows set in Toronto
Television shows filmed in Toronto